Pilauco Airport,  is an airport  north of Osorno, a city in the Los Lagos Region of Chile.

See also

Transport in Chile
List of airports in Chile

References

External links
OpenStreetMap - Pilauco
OurAirports - Pilauco
FallingRain - Pilauco Airport

Airports in Chile
Airports in Los Lagos Region